Ronald D'Emory Coleman (born November 29, 1941) is an American 
politician and former Democratic member of the United States House of Representatives from Texas.

Early life and career
Born in El Paso, Texas, Coleman attended public schools, earned a B.A. from the University of Texas at El Paso in 1963, and a J.D. from the University of Texas School of Law in 1967.

He served in the United States Army from 1967 to 1969, attaining the rank of captain. He was a public school teacher in El Paso and a legislative aid in both houses of the Texas Legislature. He was admitted to the bar and was an assistant county attorney in El Paso County from 1969 to 1973. He attended the University of Kent in 1981.

Political career
Coleman was elected to the Texas House of Representatives in 1972, and was reelected four additional times. He was a delegate to the Texas constitutional convention in 1974.

Congress
He was not a candidate for re-election to the 105th United States Congress. In 1992, it was revealed that Coleman had over 670 overdrafts as part of the House banking scandal but was still able to win re-election. In Congress he was a member of the House Appropriations Committee, the House Armed Services Committee, and the Select Committee on Intelligence.

References

External links
 

1941 births
Living people
Alumni of the University of Kent
Democratic Party members of the United States House of Representatives from Texas
Educators from Texas
Democratic Party members of the Texas House of Representatives
Military personnel from Texas
Politicians from El Paso, Texas
Texas lawyers
United States Army officers
University of Texas at El Paso alumni
University of Texas School of Law alumni